Sára Kaňkovská (born 22 June 1998) is a Czech professional racing cyclist. She rode in the women's 500 m time trial event at the 2019 UEC European Track Championships.

References

1998 births
Living people
Czech female cyclists
Place of birth missing (living people)